Eslamabad Rural District is a rural district (dehestan) in the Central District of Zarand County, Kerman Province, Iran. At the 2006 census, its population was 830, in 210 families. The rural district has 4 villages.

References 

Rural Districts of Kerman Province
Zarand County